This article lists events from the year 2017 in The Bahamas.

Incumbents 
 Monarch: Elizabeth II
 Governor-General: Dame Marguerite Pindling 
 Prime Minister: Perry Christie (until May 10); Hubert Minnis (from May 11)

Events 
 May 10 - Bahamian General election is held

Deaths

See also
List of years in the Bahamas

References

Links

 
2010s in the Bahamas
Years of the 21st century in the Bahamas
Bahamas
Bahamas